Liu Wenzhi ((964–1028)) was a Chinese government official of the Song Dynasty.

Biography 
Gong feng guan (Chinese: 供奉官)
Dai Zhou zhi mou zhou jun zhou shi (Chinese: 代州知某州軍州事)
Qing Zhou zhi mou zhou jun zhou shi (Chinese: 慶州知某州軍州事)
Bin Zhou zhi mou zhou jun zhou shi (Chinese: 邠州知某州軍州事)
Jing Zhou zhi mou zhou jun zhou shi (Chinese: 涇州知某州軍州事)
Nei yuan shi (Chinese: 內園使)
Xi jing zuo cang ku shi (Chinese: 西京左藏庫使)
Zuo cang ku fu shi (Chinese: 左藏庫副使)
Lin Zhou bing ma qian xia (Chinese: 麟州兵馬鈐轄)
Kelan Jun jun shi (Chinese: 岢嵐軍軍使)
Zhou bing ma qian xia (Chinese: 州兵馬鈐轄)
Liangzhe Lu zhuan yun shi (Chinese: 兩浙路轉運使)

Family 
father-in-law: Li Pu (Chinese: 李溥)
father: Liu Shenqi (Chinese: 劉審奇)
brother: Liu Wenyu (Chinese: 劉文裕)
brother: Liu Wenyuan (Chinese: 劉文遠)
son: Liu Huan (Chinese: 劉渙)
son: Liu Hu (Chinese: 劉滬)
son: Liu Chun (Chinese: 劉淳)
son: Liu Chen (Chinese: 劉諶)
son: Liu Wei (Chinese: 劉渭)

External links

Song dynasty politicians
Year of birth unknown
Year of death unknown
964 births
1028 deaths